The Sea Flower is a 1918 American silent adventure film directed by Colin Campbell and starring Juanita Hansen, Gayne Whitman and Fred Huntley.

Cast
 Juanita Hansen as Lurline 
 Gayne Whitman as Truxton Darnley 
 Fred Huntley as 'Brandy' Cain 
 Eugenie Besserer as Kealani 
 Fred Starr as Gus Olsen 
 George C. Pearce as Von Linterman 
 Alfred Allen as 'Gun' Fowler

References

Bibliography
 Donald W. McCaffrey & Christopher P. Jacobs. Guide to the Silent Years of American Cinema. Greenwood Publishing, 1999.

External links
 

1918 films
1918 adventure films
American silent feature films
American adventure films
American black-and-white films
Films directed by Colin Campbell
Universal Pictures films
1910s English-language films
1910s American films
Silent adventure films